The Cả pass (Đèo Cả) is a mountain pass in Phú Yên Province, Vietnam. The mountains are known as the Cả pass mountains (núi Cả Đèo). Historically the Cả Pass was the second most difficult col in Vietnam after Hải Vân Pass. In 1611, the Nguyen pushed their border down to Cả Pass.

The pass is also known as Đèo Cục Kịch. In the French documents the pass name is "Col Babonneau".

References

Mountain passes of Vietnam
Landforms of Phú Yên province